Stratton Brook State Park is a public recreation area located in the town of Simsbury, Connecticut. Among its notable features is the Massaco Forest Pavilion, built by the Civilian Conservation Corps in 1935. The  state park offers picnicking, fishing, swimming, hiking, biking, cross-country skiing, and ice fishing as well as a seasonal nature center.

References

External links
Stratton Brook State Park Connecticut Department of Energy and Environmental Protection
Stratton Brook State Park Map Connecticut Department of Energy and Environmental Protection

State parks of Connecticut
Simsbury, Connecticut
Parks in Hartford County, Connecticut
Nature centers in Connecticut
Civilian Conservation Corps in Connecticut
Protected areas established in 1949